Edward Alexander Harris (born July 18, 1936) is a Canadian former professional ice hockey player.

Playing career
Harris played in the National Hockey League from 1963 to 1975. During this time, he played for the Montreal Canadiens, Minnesota North Stars, Detroit Red Wings, St. Louis Blues, and Philadelphia Flyers. He won four Stanley Cups with Montreal and a fifth with Philadelphia.  He currently resides in southern New Jersey, just outside Philadelphia.
Harris also fought Hockey Hall of Fame Rookie Bobby Orr in Orr's first regular season NHL fight.

Awards and achievements
MJHL First Team Allstar (1955)
Turnbull Cup (MJHL) Championship (1955)
Calder Cup (AHL) Championships (1961, 1962, with Springfrield
Calder Cup (AHL) Championships (1964 with Cleveland Barons)
AHL First All-Star Team (1964)
Eddie Shore Award Winner (1964)
NHL Second All-Star Team (1969)
Played in NHL All-Star Game (1965, 1967, 1969, 1971, 1972)
Stanley Cup Championships (1965, 1966, 1968, & 1969) with Montreal as Edward Harris
Stanley Cup Championship (1975) with Philadelphia as Ted Harris
Ted is an “Honoured Member” of the Manitoba Hockey Hall of Fame

Career statistics

Regular season and playoffs

NHL coaching record

External links
 
Ted Harris's biography at Manitoba Hockey Hall of Fame

1936 births
Living people
Canadian ice hockey defencemen
Cleveland Barons (1937–1973) players
Detroit Red Wings captains
Detroit Red Wings players
Minnesota North Stars coaches
Minnesota North Stars players
Montreal Canadiens players
Philadelphia Flyers players
St. Louis Blues players
Ice hockey people from Winnipeg
Springfield Indians players
Stanley Cup champions
Winnipeg Monarchs players
Canadian ice hockey coaches